The Warrington is a Grade II listed public house at Warrington Crescent, Maida Vale, London W9 1EH.

It is on the Campaign for Real Ale's National Inventory of Historic Pub Interiors.

It was built in the mid-19th century.

It was used in series 1 of The Sweeney episode Night Out and Minder series 2, episode 7 The Beer Hunter.

As of August 2015, it is operated by the Faucet Inn pub company.

Faucet Inn filed for insolvency as of 8 January 2019, and The Warrington is currently under the ownership of Golden Brick Pubs Limited.

References

External links
 

Grade II listed pubs in the City of Westminster
National Inventory Pubs
Maida Vale